Princess is a 7" single by Sebadoh, released in 1996. It was only available by mail-order.

"Princess" (entitled "Prince-S") would later appear on the album Harmacy.

Track listing 
"Princess"
"1/2 Undressed"
"Act of Being Polite" (The Residents cover)
"Moisture" (The Residents cover)
"Suburban Bathers" (The Residents cover)

References

1996 EPs
Sebadoh EPs
Sub Pop EPs